Bhargavi Nilayam is a 1964 Indian Malayalam-language romantic horror film directed by A. Vincent (in his directorial debut) and written by Vaikom Muhammad Basheer based on his own short story Neelavelicham. The film stars Madhu, Vijaya Nirmala, Prem Nazir and P. J. Antony.

The film depicts a compassionate relationship between a talented novelist and the spirit of a beautiful lady who had been murdered. The novelist is writing the story of this lady, into whose house he has moved in as tenant. The film mirrors in a meta-cinematic fashion the close and often symbiotic relationships between Malayalam filmmakers and writers in depicting a writer at work, collaborating with an intangible agency in the form of the eponymous Bhargavi. It was the directorial debut of noted cinematographer A. Vincent. It is especially noted for its camera works by P. Bhaskar Rao and music by M. S. Baburaj. It is generally regarded as the first horror film in Malayalam and was one of the biggest hit films of all time.

Plot 
An enthusiastic and talented novelist comes to stay in a desolate mansion named Bhargavi Nilayam. The novelist and his servant Cheriya Pareekkanni experience the presence of a strange entity here. They learn from the local people that it is a haunted house. The story is that it is haunted by the ghost of the daughter of the previous owner. The novelist and his servant encounter strange happenings here – the gramophone plays on its own, objects move around. The novelist finds some old letters written to Bhargavi by her lover Sasikumar. It is believed that the ghost of Bhargavi now haunts this house.

The letters give some indication about their love affair and their tragic death. The novelist decides to probe the matter. He starts writing the story of Bhargavi. The information gathered from the local people and the hints in the letters help him in his writing. The story develops. Bhargavi falls in love with her neighbour Sasikumar who is a talented poet and singer. Bharagavi's father's nephew, Nanukuttan is also in love with Bhargavi. But Bhargavi hates Nanukuttan who is a wicked wastrel. Nanukuttan tries all nasty tricks to separate the lovers. He kills Sasikumar by poisoning his food. Bharagavi becomes furious when she learns of her lover's murder. In a scuffle Nanukuttan pushes Bhargavi into a well, killing her. Nanukuttan spreads the news that Bhargavi had committed suicide.

The novelist reads out the story to the ghost who by now has become quite compassionate with him. Nanukuttan overhears the story. He fears that once the story is published the truth behind the death of Bhargavi and Sasikumar will be out. He attacks the novelist and a fight ensues. During the fight both Nanukuttan and the novelist reaches the well in which Bhargavi was drowned. While trying to push the novelist into the well, Nanukuttan loses his balance. He falls into the well and is killed, while the novelist has a narrow escape. The novelist then prays for the peace of Bhargavi's soul and the movie ends with the laugh of Bhargavi.

Cast 
Principal cast
Madhu as novelist
Prem Nazir as Sasikumar
Vijaya Nirmala as Bhargavi
P. J. Antony as Narayanan Nair aka Nanukuttan
Adoor Bhasi as Cheriya Pareekanni
Kottayam Santha as Suma
Kuthiravattam Pappu as Kuthiravattam Pappu
Mala Shantha as Bhargavi's mother (voiced by TR Omana)
Cameo appearances

 Shobana Parameshwaran Nair as mail carrier

Production 
The screenplay written by Vaikom Muhammad Basheer is based on his own short story "Neelavelicham". But the film also contains instances from some of his other short stories which he claims as his own life experiences. The scene were the young writer saw a beautiful woman on a beach is actually adapted from the short story "Nilavu Kanumbol" where Basheer himself claims that he has seen a naked woman taking bath on a beach and when he tried to speak to her she disappeared. Similarly, the scene where the young Bhargavi requests Sasikumar's help for preparing a speech is actually based on the short story "Hunthrappy Bussatto", which again we can find in the autobiographical novel Anuragathinte Dinangal. The lyrics for the song "Ekanthathayude Apaara Theeram" is taken from the short story "Anargha Nimisham".

Soundtrack 
The film had a successful and acclaimed soundtrack composed by M. S. Baburaj which is regarded as the noted composer's master piece. The lyrics are penned by noted poet P. Bhaskaran. The soundtrack consists of seven songs, mostly based on Hindustani. Baburaj took inspiration from popular Bollywood songs while composing "Thamasamenthe Varuvan" (from "Mere Mehboob Tujhe" and also perhaps from "Humse Aaya Na Gaya") and "Vasantha Panchami" (from "Chaudhwin Ka Chand").

The soundtrack received immense critical praise for the high quality instrumentation and was one of the biggest audio hits of all time. The song "Thamasamenthe Varuvan" was selected by Naushad Ali as one of the few of his favourite songs when he visited Baburaj Music Academy in 1988. "Thamasamenthe Varuvan" is also regarded as one of the most loved songs in Malayalam music history. It was voted the "Best Song in Malayalam" by Malayala Manorama in a special issue published as part of 50th anniversary of formation of Kerala state.

Box office 
The film was highest grossing Malayalam film at that time and a commercial success.

Remake
A remake of the film titled Neelavelicham directed by Aashiq Abu is set to hit theatres in April 2023.

See also 
 List of Malayalam horror films

References

External links 
 

1960s Malayalam-language films
1960s romance films
1964 directorial debut films
1964 films
1964 horror films
Films directed by A. Vincent
Indian black-and-white films
Indian romantic horror films
Works by Vaikom Muhammad Basheer